The Urtatagai conflict was a conflict between the Soviet Union and the Emirate of Afghanistan in the mid-1920s over the control of the island of Urtatagai, which is an island on the Amu Darya river that had been claimed by Afghanistan since 1900, although it was under Russian control until 1920, when remnants of the Imperial Russian Army evacuated the island to aid the White Movement in the Russian Civil War. The Afghan Army had earlier unsuccessfully tried to enforce its claim on Urtatagai in a border conflict in 1913, and in 1920 Afghan forces were finally able to capture the island unopposed. On 27 November 1925, due to repeated incursions into Soviet territory by Basmachi rebels using the island as a base, as well as the Soviet claim to the Island, 340 Soviet troops landed on the island of Urtatagai, and a clash with the island's garrison saw 12 people killed, and 5 Afghans were taken prisoner. On 18 December, the Prime Minister of Afghanistan issued a letter of protest, making four key demands:

 That the Soviets abandon the island
 That prisoners of war be returned
 That Afghan losses be recovered
 That official apologies be rendered

On 19 December, after the Soviets failed to answer the letter, the Afghan Government began to deploy troops towards the North. To the surprise of the Soviet leadership, Western press took interest in the conflict, and supported the Afghan government. With potential war looming, the Soviet leadership decided to let a joint commission decide Urtatagai's fate, which ruled in favour of Afghanistan. On 28 February 1926, the Soviets transferred the island to Afghanistan in a ceremony. Negotiations regarding official Soviet recognition ensued for the following months, and after the Afghan government agreed to restrain Basmachi border raids, the Soviet government officially recognized Urtatagai as part of the Afghan state on 15 August 1926.

References 

Conflicts in 1925
Conflicts in 1926
Wars involving Afghanistan
Wars involving the Soviet Union
1925 in Afghanistan
1926 in Afghanistan